The Louisiana Community and Technical College System (LCTCS) manages thirteen public 2-year institutions in the state of Louisiana. It is headquartered in Baton Rouge, and is located on the campus of Baton Rouge Community College. The chair of the Board of Supervisors is Vincent St. Blanc III, and the President is Dr. Joe D. May.

LCTCS Colleges
Baton Rouge Community College
Bossier Parish Community College
Central Louisiana Technical Community College
Delgado Community College
L. E. Fletcher Technical Community College
Louisiana Delta Community College
Louisiana Technical College (with its 40 campuses)
Northshore Technical Community College
Northwest Louisiana Technical College
Nunez Community College
River Parishes Community College
South Central Louisiana Technical College
South Louisiana Community College
Sowela Technical Community College

See also
 List of colleges and universities in Louisiana
 List of hospitals in Louisiana

References

External links
 LCTCS Homepage

 
Public university systems in the United States